Khalifatan (also Romanized as Khalīfatān) is a village in Rowzeh Chay Rural District, in the Central District of Urmia County, West Azerbaijan Province, Iran. At the 2006 census, its population was 267, in 44 families.

References 

Populated places in Urmia County